Stitt's Bits is an album by saxophonist Sonny Stitt compiling tracks recorded in 1950 and released on the Prestige label in 1958.

Reception
The Allmusic review awarded the album 3 stars.

Track listing 
 "Avalon" (Buddy DeSylva, Al Jolson, Vincent Rose) – 2:26
 "Mean to Me" (Fred E. Ahlert, Roy Turk) – 3:04 
 "Stairway to the Stars" (Matty Malneck, Frank Signorelli, Mitchell Parish) – 3:12
 "Count Every Star" (Sammy Gallop, Bruno Coquatrix) – 2:57  
 "Nice Work If You Can Get It" (George Gershwin, Ira Gershwin) – 2:37   
 "There Will Never Be Another You" (Harry Warren, Mack Gordon) – 2:32  
 "Blazin'" (Sonny Stitt) – 3:22
 "After You've Gone" (Turner Layton, Henry Creamer) – 2:25 
 "Our Very Own" (Jack Elliott, Victor Young) – 3:05 
 "'S Wonderful" (George Gershwin, Ira Gershwin) – 2:24
 "Jeepers Creepers" (Warren, Johnny Mercer) – 2:54  
 "Nevertheless" (Harry Ruby, Bert Kalmar) – 2:49 
Recorded in New York City on February 17, 1950 (tracks 1–3), June 28, 1950 (tracks 4–7), October 8, 1950 (tracks 8–10) and  December 15, 1950 (tracks 11 & 12)

Personnel 
Sonny Stitt – tenor saxophone
Bill Massey – trumpet (tracks 8–10)
Matthew Gee – trombone (tracks 8–10)
Gene Ammons – baritone saxophone (tracks 8–10)
Kenny Drew (tracks 1–3), Duke Jordan (tracks 4–7), Junior Mance (tracks 8–12) – piano
Tommy Potter (tracks 1–3), Gene Wright (tracks 4–12) – bass
Art Blakey (tracks 1–3, 11 & 12), Wes Landers (tracks 4–10) – drums
Larry Townsend – vocals (tracks 8–10)

References 

1958 compilation albums
Prestige Records compilation albums
Sonny Stitt compilation albums
Albums produced by Bob Weinstock